A crime forum is a generic term for an Internet forum specialising in computer crime and Internet fraud activities such as hacking, identity theft, phishing, pharming, malware or spamming.

During the early days of the Internet, public dial up BBSes would serve to put miscreants in touch with one another to share tips of credit card fraud, hacking and other illicit services.

By the 2000s and the rise of the modern internet, modern internet forum software was preferred, with private invite-only sites being the most long lived. Sites like ShadowCrew, counterfeitlibrary.com and the Russian language carderplanet.com would specialise in various illegal activities before each eventually succumbing to law enforcement action.

By 2015, notorious forums such as Darkode would be infiltrated and dismantled prior to returning with increased security.

As of July 2015, there are estimated to be several hundred such forums.

See also 
 Carding (fraud)
 Darknet market
 Hacker (computer security)
 Hacker group
 Operation Shrouded Horizon
 Nulled

References 

Cybercrime
Internet forums
Internet fraud
Crime forums
Dark web